Syriac is a Unicode block containing characters for all forms of the Syriac alphabet, including the Estrangela, Serto, Eastern Syriac, and the Christian Palestinian Aramaic variants. It is used in Literary Syriac, Neo-Aramaic, and Arabic among Syriac-speaking Christians. It was used historically to write Armenian, Persian, Ottoman Turkish, and Malayalam.

Additional Syriac letters used for writing the Malayalam language are encoded in the Syriac Supplement block.

Unicode chart

History
The following Unicode-related documents record the purpose and process of defining specific characters in the Syriac block:

Character list

References 

Unicode blocks